Cheshmeh Paryan (also Romanized as Cheshmeh Paryān and Cheshmeh-ye Paryān; also known as Cham Paryān) is a village in Sepiddasht Rural District, Papi District, Khorramabad County, Lorestan Province, Iran. At the 2006 census, its population was 148, in 27 families.

References 

Towns and villages in Khorramabad County